Natasha Chmyreva defeated Regina Maršíková in the final, 6–4, 6–3 to win the girls' singles tennis title at the 1975 Wimbledon Championships.

Draw

Finals

Top half

Section 1

Section 2

Bottom half

Section 3

Section 4

References

External links

Girls' Singles
Wimbledon Championship by year – Girls' singles
Wimb